Haley Tanner is an American writer and novelist.

Literary career
Tanner's first novel, Vaclav & Lena, was published by Random House in 2011. The titular characters are growing up in Brooklyn's Russian immigrant community.

She has been interviewed by The Forward and NPR.

Personal life 
Tanner was born and raised in Westchester County, New York. She holds an MFA in creative writing from The New School.

Tanner and her partner, musician Josh Ritter, had their first child, Beatrix Wendylove Ritter, on November 11, 2012. They own a home together in Woodstock, New York.

Awards and honors
The National Book Foundation named Tanner as a "5 Under 35 Author" in 2012.

Publications

References

External links 
 

1982 births
Living people
The New School alumni